Stephen Anthony Martin (November 26, 1871 – February 16, 1957) was an American politician from the state of Iowa.

Martin was born in Centerville, Appanoose County, Iowa in 1871. He served as a Republican in the Iowa House of Representatives for four terms from 1939 to 1947. Martin died in Centerville in 1957, and was interred in Oakland Cemetery, Centerville, Iowa

References

1871 births
1957 deaths
People from Centerville, Iowa
Republican Party members of the Iowa House of Representatives